Grevillea virgata, commonly known as Nerong grevillea, is a species of flowering plant in the family Proteaceae. It is an upright shrub with white flowers and is endemic to the Central Coast of New South Wales.

Description
The lower surface is visible and loosely to occasional with almost silky flattened hairs . The white flowers are borne at the end of branches, upright or curved downward, broadly on one side in groups of 10-24. The perianth is white with occasional silky flattened hairs, densely on limbs, inside occasionally bearded.

Taxonomy and naming
Grevillea virgata was first formally described in 2000 by Robert Owen Makinson and the description was published in Flora of Australia. The specific epithet (virgata) means "long and slender".

Distribution and habitat
Nerong grevillea grows near swamps of the lower Myall River and Bulahdelah to Nerong in New South Wales.

References

virgata
Proteales of Australia
Flora of New South Wales
Taxa named by Robert Owen Makinson